Alexander Bailey may refer to:

 Alexander H. Bailey (1817–1874), U.S. Representative and judge from New York
 Alexander Bailey (Wisconsin politician) (1824–1909), member of the Wisconsin State Assembly
 Alex Bailey (footballer) (born 1983), English footballer
 Alex Bailey (musician) (born 1987), American drummer and bassist
 Alex Davison Bailey (1882–1968), American mechanical and utilities executive